Eric  Pieroun Pen is a Cambodian American heavyweight boxer from California, United States but represents Cambodia. He is an orthodox fighter. He won the WBA Asia heavyweight title on Saturday 15, February 2020.

Professional career
In his professional career so far he has 6 wins with 5 knockouts and 0 losses. Most of his fights have been in Asia. His first pro boxing fight was in Thailand Ram 100 Thai Boxing Stadium, Ramkamhaeng, Bangkok.

References

Heavyweight boxers
Boxers from California
Living people
American people of Cambodian descent
1991 births